All About Eve is the self-titled first album of All About Eve. Commercially, this was their most successful, reaching No. 7 in the UK charts and spawning four Top 40 singles (one of which went top 10). Most of the album was produced by Paul Samwell-Smith.

Release
Some of the earlier cassette versions of the album had the album title Flowers in Our Hair printed on both sides of the tape, instead of All About Eve.

Although drummer Mark Price was a full-time member of the band when this album was completed, he was not present for all of its recording. Some songs feature Mick Brown, on loan from The Mission, one features session drummer Greg Brimstone, and one features a drum machine.

The album spent 29 weeks in the UK top 100 album charts, and is certified Gold with in excess of 100,000 units being sold.

All About Eve was bolstered by several singles preceding and following the album's February 1988 release: "In the Clouds" charted at No. 47 on the UK Singles Chart, "Wild Hearted Woman"/"Apple Tree Man" at No. 33, "Every Angel" at No. 30, "Martha's Harbour" at No. 10, and "What Kind of Fool" at No. 29. A different version of "Flowers in Our Hair" was released as a single (no chart position) under the band's own "Eden" label before they signed to Mercury and recorded this album.

In return for Julianne Regan helping out on backing vocals for The Mission's first studio album, God's Own Medicine, Wayne Hussey lent his backing vocals to the song "Shelter from the Rain". Hussey and his bandmate Simon Hinkler also produced "Lady Moonlight".

"She Moves Through the Fair" is the only non-All About Eve composition on the album, it being a traditional Irish folk song.

One of the B-sides to the single "What Kind of Fool" was "The Garden of Jane Delawney", originally by Trees.

Track listing
All songs written and composed by Tim Bricheno, Andy Cousin and Julianne Regan except where noted.

Re-issue 
On 25 September 2015, the album was reissued with 12" versions of some tracks, including singles and B-sides, as part of Universal UMC "Re-presents" series.

Disc One 

 Flowers in Our Hair
 Gypsy Dance
 In the Clouds
 Martha's Harbour
 Every Angel
 Shelter from the Rain
 She Moves Through the Fair
 Wild Hearted Woman
 Never Promise (Anyone Forever)
 What Kind of Fool
 In the Meadow
 Our Summer (extended version)
 Flowers in Our Hair (extended version)
 In the Clouds (extended version)
 Wild Hearted Woman (extended version)
 Every Angel (extended version)
 What Kind of Fool (Autumn Rhapsody)
Re-Issues notes disc one: Tracks 1-6, 9-14, 16, 17 by Bricheno, Cousin, Regan (as on song listing [i.e., not alphabetical]). Track 7 is a traditional Irish folk song, arrangements by Bricheno, Cousin, Regan. Tracks 8 and 15 by Bricheno, Brown, Cousin, Regan.

Disc Two 

 Our Summer
 Lady Moonlight
 Shelter from the Rain (B-side version)
 Flowers in Our Hair (single version)
 Paradise
 Devil Woman
 Calling Your Name
 Apple Tree Man
 Like Emily
 What Kind of Fool (reprise)
 Every Angel (single version)
 Wild Flowers
 Candy Tree
 More Than This Hour
 Another Door
 In the Meadow (live)
 Never Promise (Anyone Forever) (live)
 What Kind of Fool (single version)
 Gold and Silver
 The Garden of Jane Delawney
Re-issue notes disc two: Tracks 1-18 by Bricheno, Cousin, Regan. Track 19 by Bricheno, Cousin, Price, Regan; this is the original b-side version, subsequently re-recorded for the second All About Eve album, Scarlet and Other Stories. Track 20 by Bias Boshell is a Trees cover.

Personnel
All About Eve
Julianne Regan - vocals, keyboards, percussion, piano, recorder, strings, horns
Tim Bricheno - guitars
Andy Cousin - bass
Mark Price - drums, percussion

Additional personnel

Mick Brown - drums
Greg Brimstone - drums
Simon Hinkler – keyboards
Wayne Hussey - backing vocals on "Shelter from the Rain"
Adam Peters – arranger and conductor on "What Kind of Fool"
Paul Samwell-Smith – drone, horns, piano on "Wild Hearted Woman", recorder, strings
Ric Sanders – violin
Peter-John Vettese – keyboards

References

1988 debut albums
All About Eve (band) albums
Albums produced by Paul Samwell-Smith
Albums produced by Richard Gottehrer
Mercury Records albums